Amravan (also Romanized as Amravān, ‘Amrevān, and Amrevān) is a village in Qohab-e Sarsar Rural District, Amirabad District, Damghan County, Semnan Province, Iran. At the 2006 census, its population was 141, in 45 families.

References 

Populated places in Damghan County